Events in the year 1878 in Norway.

Incumbents
Monarch: Oscar II

Events
 A law is passed that requires teachers to speak the local dialect of their pupils and not the other way round.

Arts and literature

Births

13 January – Henrik Østervold, sailor and Olympic gold medallist (died 1957)
17 January – Olaf Husby, sport shooter
18 January – Gudmund Sundby, engineer (died 1973).
1 February – Thoralf Glad, sailor and Olympic gold medallist (died 1969)
7 February – Lul Krag, painter (died 1956)
19 February – Kristofer Uppdal, poet and author (died 1961)
14 April – Karl Johan Pettersen Vadøy, politician (died 1965)
27 April – Christian Fredrik Monsen, politician (died 1954)
27 May – Arne Kavli, painter (died 1970)
18 July – Egill Reimers, architect, sailor and Olympic gold medallist (died 1946)
12 August – Østen Østensen, rifle shooter and Olympic silver medallist (died 1939)
7 November – Knut Markhus, educator and politician (died 1963).
28 November – Peder Kolstad, politician and Prime Minister of Norway (died 1932)

Full date unknown
Per Berg Lund, politician and Minister (died 1954)
Magnus Olsen, linguist and professor of Norse philology (died 1963)
Anton Frederik Winter Jakhelln Prytz, politician (died 1945)

Deaths
25 April – Nils Christian Irgens, military officer, politician and Minister (born 1811)
8 September – Ulrik Frederik Lange, politician (born 1808)

Full date unknown
Jørgen Wright Cappelen, bookseller and publisher (born 1805)
Johan Widing Heiberg Landmark, jurist and politician (born 1802)
Peter Tidemand Malling, bookseller, printer and publisher (born 1807)

See also

References